Franz Türler was a Swiss rower. He competed at the 1920 Summer Olympics in Antwerp with the men's eight where they were eliminated in round one.

References

External links

Date of birth missing
Date of death missing
Swiss male rowers
Olympic rowers of Switzerland
Rowers at the 1920 Summer Olympics
European Rowing Championships medalists
20th-century Swiss people